Benay Lappe (Hebrew:בִּנֵיי לַפֶּה/בנאי לאפה) is an American rabbi and a teacher of Talmud in the United States. In 2016, Lappe was awarded the Covenant Award for innovation in Jewish education by the Covenant Foundation.

Biography

Lappe was born on April 13, 1960, and grew up in Evanston, Illinois. She earned a BA in Italian literature and a MA in education from the University of Illinois, an MA in Hebrew letters from the University of Judaism, and an MA in rabbinic literature, as well as a semicha (rabbinic ordination) from the Jewish Theological Seminary of America.

Lappe is a professor at the University of Illinois, Temple University, American Jewish University, the Reconstructionist Rabbinical College, and the Graduate Theological Union's Richard S. Dinner Center for Jewish Studies affiliated with the University of California, Berkeley. She is professor of Talmud at the Hebrew Seminary in Skokie, Illinois, and serves as the executive director and Rosh Yeshiva of SVARA (Hebrew:סְבָרָא), a yeshiva in Chicago.

References

Further reading
 
 
 Lappe, Benay (2001). “Saying No in the Name of a Higher Yes”.Lesbian Rabbis: The First Generation, pp. 197–216 (Rebecca Alpert et al. eds.).
 Lappe, Benay (January/February 2003). “Educating Rabbis to be traditional radicals...once again”.Shma: A Journal of Jewish Responsibility, 33, no. 597/598.
 Lappe, Benay (December 28, 1990). “Does A Child Who Has Been Sexually Abused By A Parent Have The Obligation To Say Kaddish For That Parent?”.Shma: A Journal of Jewish Responsibility, 21, no. 404.

20th-century American rabbis
Talmudists
Living people
Jewish feminists
Jewish scholars
American Jewish theologians
Conservative women rabbis
Jewish American writers
LGBT theologians
Women Jewish theologians
1960 births
LGBT rabbis
American LGBT people
21st-century American rabbis
21st-century LGBT people